The 1977 Wellington City mayoral election was part of the New Zealand local elections held that same year. In 1977, election were held for the Mayor of Wellington plus other local government positions including eighteen city councillors. The polling was conducted using the standard first-past-the-post electoral method.

Background
The 1977 mayoralty was notable for the highly publicized candidacy of Carmen Rupe, a transgender drag performer and brothel keeper. With the support of local businessman Bob Jones, who organised her campaign and wrote her speeches, Carmen's campaign utilised the slogans Get in Behind and Carmen for Mayor and campaigned on a platform to legalise gay marriage and brothels, despite neither being local-government matters in New Zealand.

Former mayor Sir Frank Kitts attempted a comeback after losing narrowly three years earlier. His candidature took many by surprise with the press expecting Labour to try and rejuvenate. Local businessman Jim Belich was approached, but he declined for personal reasons. Frank O'Flynn also considered standing, but withdrew in favour of Kitts, though O'Flynn stood on the council ticket and was elected. A Dominion editorial said of Kitts' candidature "No one knew what Frank Kitts did during his three years in the political wilderness and no one knew why he wanted to come back". His support in the mayoral race fell further, though he was again elected to the Wellington Harbour Board where his vote increased.

Mayoralty results

Councillor results

 
 
 
 
 
 
 
 
 
 
 
 
  
 
 
 
 
 
 
 
 
 

 
 
 
 
 
 
 
 
 
 
 
 
 
 
 
 
 
 

 
 
 

 

Table footnotes:
<noinclude>

References

Mayoral elections in Wellington
1977 elections in New Zealand
Politics of the Wellington Region
October 1977 events in New Zealand
1970s in Wellington